Min Áigi (Our Time in Northern Sami) was a twice-weekly Northern Sámi language newspaper based in Kárášjohka, Norway. In 2008, Min Áigi ceased publication to merge with the rival paper Áššu to form Ávvir.

History
Min Áigi was founded as a continuation of the influential Sámi newspaper Sámi Áigi, which went bankrupt in March 1993. The first issue of Min Áigi was published two months later on 22 May 1993. 

Although the newspaper's editorial staff and most of its subscribers were from Norway, Min Áigi was intended to be a newspaper for Sámi people throughout the Nordic countries. Finnmark Dagblad in Hammerfest was the main stakeholder in the newspaper through the company Min Áigi OS. Other stakeholders include Kárášjoga gielda, the Norgga Sámiid Riikasearvi, the Samiid Ædnansær’vi / Samenes Landsforbund and the publisher Davvi Girji. The editor-in-chief was Svein Nordsletta. 

Min Áigi also published a children's magazine called Leavedolgi.

Min Áigi maintained local offices in Deatnu Tana, Guovdageaidnu, and Johkamohkki. Its marketing department was based in Leavdnja.

Merger 
On 27 August 2007, Min Áigi and its rival Áššu announced plans to merge to create a Northern Sámi-language daily newspaper, Ávvir. A week after Min Áigi published its final issue, Ávvir launched on 6 February 2008, the Sami National Day. Min Áigi chairman Magne Svineng stated that due to higher production costs, mergering Áššu and Min Áigi was the only way to meet the need for a daily Sámi-language newspaper with wide distribution. Ávvir maintained editorial bureaus in Kárášjohka and Guovdageaidnu, the respective headquarters of Min Áigi and Áššu.

Circulation

See also
 Áššu
 Ávvir

Notes

External links
Min Áigi (Davvisápmi)

Northern Sámi-language newspapers
Amedia
Publications established in 1993
Sámi in Norway
1993 establishments in Norway
Sámi newspapers